Moldoveanu is a Romanian-language surname that may refer to:

Alin Moldoveanu (born 1983), Romanian 10 m Air Rifle sport shooter
Ioachim Moldoveanu (1913–1981), Romanian footballer 
Vasile Moldoveanu (born 1935), Romanian tenor
Vlad Moldoveanu (born 1988), Romanian basketball player

See also
Moldovan (surname)

Romanian-language surnames
Ethnonymic surnames